Pavel Bordukov (born 10 April 1993) is a Belarusian footballer playing currently for Dnepr Mogilev.

References

External links
 
 
 Profile at Pressball.by

1993 births
Living people
People from Mogilev
Sportspeople from Mogilev Region
Belarusian footballers
Association football midfielders
FC Dnepr Mogilev players
FC Belshina Bobruisk players